Tollygunge (nicknamed 'Mini Mumbai' or 'Mini Bombay') is a locality of South Kolkata, in West Bengal, India. It is famed as the centre of the Indian film industry, known as Tollywood, Marathi Cinema, South Indian Cinema and Bollywood.

History
In the 18th century, Tollygunge, then called Rasa Pagla, was a jungle with garden houses of the Europeans located here and there. The Europeans, living in the central areas of old Calcutta, had a craze for villas far out in the sleepy villages, coming up as suburbs. It was renamed after Colonel William Tolly who made the dead Adi Ganga channel navigable in 1774. Tipu Sultan's sons settled down in the area after the Vellore Mutiny in 1806. The British extended their patronage to Tollygunge Club and Tollygunge Golf Club in the 19th century.

In 1888, Ballygunge and Tollygunge formed a common thana when 25 new Police Section Houses were set up. In 1889, the suburbs of Calcutta were divided among 4 municipalities. While a portion of Tollygunge formed the South Suburban Municipality, northern Tollygunge which was part of the earlier Suburban Municipality was made one of the 'added area wards' of Kolkata Municipal Corporation. In 1951, the southern part of Tollygunge was added to Calcutta.

Around 1921, Kolkata Municipal Corporation made efforts in certain areas, and that included Ballygunge-Tollygunge, to widen roads and add sewerage, water supply and other civic benefits.

With the partition of Bengal, "millions of refugees poured in from erstwhile East Pakistan... hundreds of 'refugee colonies' sprang up almost overnight all across the city and occupied all vacant land in the fringe areas. Here the refugees built their very own type of settlement, bearing some reflection of the village set-up of their lost homes... the refugees had taken command of adjoining areas such as Tollyganj and transformed them into a very different environment." The influx of refugees occurred in several spurts between 1947 and 1971. Only a small part of the influx stayed in the government transit camps and the overwhelming majority settled in squatters' colonies along the eastern fringes of the city, starting from Barrackpore in the north, through Dumdum to Jadavpur, Tollygunge and Behala, down to Sonarpur in the south. The massive influx had a major demographic, cultural, economic and political impact on the city.

There is a small red-light district is located near Prince Anwar Shah Road.

Geography

Location
It is flanked by the Eastern Railway south suburban line to the north, Lake Gardens and Golf Green in the east, the Pashchim Putiari and Purba Putiari in the south and Behala in the west. The neighbourhood is served by Mahanayak Uttam Kumar metro station of Kolkata Metro.

Neighbourhoods
Other prominent neighbourhoods in the area include Kudghat, Ranikuthi, Regent Park, Netaji Nagar and Bansdroni.

Places of interest

Other places of Interest in Tollygunge, include- 
 Tollygunge Agragami
Tollygunge Club
Royal Calcutta Golf Club (RCGC)
ITC Sangeet Research Academy
 Indrapuri Film Studio(now known as Star Studios)

Notable residents
 Ali Muhammad Shibli, anti-colonial revolutionary (born 1879)
A. C. Bhaktivedanta Swami Prabhupada, founder of ISKCON
Utpal Dutt, film actor and theater personality
Kriti Sanon, Bollywood film actress 
Rakul Preet Singh, Indian film actress
Samantha Ruth Prabhu, actress
Mahesh Manjrekar, actor, director and producer
Saiee Manjrekar, actress
Medha Manjrekar, actress
Wamiqa Gabbi, actress
Ananya Panday, actress
Chunky Pandey, actor
Jacqueline Fernandez, actress
Kiara Advani, Bollywood film actress
Varun Dhawan, actor
Anil Dhawan, actor
David Dhawan, film director
Shraddha Kapoor, actress and singer
Padmini Kolhapure, actress
Tejaswini Kolhapure, actress
Shakti Kapoor, actor
Prajakta Koli, actress
Sidharth Malhotra , actor
Pooja Hegde, actress
Shalini Pandey, actress
Sai Tamhankar, actress
Neeraj Roy, businessman
Taapsee Pannu, actress
Siddhanth Kapoor, actor
Amruta Subhash, actress
Jyoti Subhash, actress
Tara Sutaria, actress

Economy
It is among the most posh neighbourhoods of South Kolkata. South City, one of the most famous shopping malls of the city is located in the adjacent neighbourhood. It is also listed among the best places to live in Kolkata byvarious surveys and websites.

The Royal Bengal Tiger Cafe, Khan Saheb, Chowman, The Copper Kitchen, Wow! Momo, Pepe-Nero, Tolly Tales, Azad Hind Dhaba, The Grub Club, Gourmet Hut, The Mango Tree are some of the most noted eateries in this area.

Daily markets
Lake Market, along with Hatibagan, Maniktala, Sealdah and Gariahat markets, is amongst the largest markets in Kolkata. The larger markets of Kolkata have two sectors – inner and outer. The inner market is the official or core market in a planned building and the outer is a makeshift arrangement of pavement stalls. The Lake Road Market at 104 Rash Behari Avenue is a Kolkata Municipal Corporation market spread over 1.16 acres. Vegetables, fruits, betel leaf, flowers, fish, meat, egg etc. are available. There are several South Indian hotels and restaurants in the area.

The Lake Mall is a more recent addition. It is a six-storied building with a high end shopping mall, food courts and entertainment. It has been developed by the Space Group.

Charu Chandra Market at 54/1 Charu Chandra Avenue is a private road-side market spread across 0.66 acres. Vegetables, fruits, betel leaf, fish, meat, egg  and grocery are available.

Transport

Tollygunge  serves as terminal points of several transport services including the tram, city buses of the Calcutta Tramways company and the metro station.

Tollygunge Railway Station is located on the Budge Budge section of the Kolkata Suburban Railway. The Mahanayak Uttam Kumar metro station (formerly Tollygunge) had been a terminal station of the Kolkata Metro from 1984 to 2009. From 2009, the overground extension of the Metro Railway  extended the Metro's range to beyond Tollygunge up to New Garia. Hence if one's office is located in the office para areas of Park Street, Camac Street, LL Nehru Road, then one can commute through metro much more conveniently.

The first electric tramcar in Kolkata ran from Esplanade to Khidirpur in 1902 and tracks were laid up to Tollygunge in 1903.

The Calcutta Tramways Company depot in Tollyguge serves as a terminal point for the tram service (which links it to Ballygunge and B.B.D. Bagh by tram routes 24/29 and 29 respectively). Some state government buses are also operated by the same company. Bus services connecting Netaji Subhash Chandra Bose International Airport via New Town passes through it.

The major auto routes are Ranikuthi-Garia More, Ranikuthi-Tollygunge Tram Depot, Ranikuthi- Baghajatin, Ranikuthi-Jadavpur 8B, Tollygunge Tram Depot-Jadavpur 8B and Prince Anwar Shah More-Jadavpur Police Station.

Educational institutions
South Academy High School  (Near Bansdroni Bazar )
 Maharishi Vidyamandir (Near Bansdroni Fire Brigade) 
 G.D.Birla Centre For Education
Calcutta Institute of Engineering and Management
Sir Nripendranath Institution
 Adarsh Hindi High School
 Bangur High School
Gangapuri Siksha Sadan
Paschim Putiary Sukharanjan Vidyamandir High School
Naktala High School
Netaji Nagar Vidyamandir
Swami Pranabananda Vidyapith
The Assembly of God Church School
Narmada High School
Brajamohan Tewary Institution
Mansur Habibullah Memorial School (Formerly: South End School), Kudghat beside Netaji metro station
Ashok Nagar Boys High School (co.education)
Milan Garh Girls High School
The Future Foundation School
ITI Tollygunge
Gandhi Colony Madhyamik Vidyalaya (Boys & Girls)
Tirthapati Institution

Culture
The area is the centre of the Bengali film industry, which is known by the nickname Tollywood, and is the location of Indrapuri Studio and Technician Studio, a favourite hub for the late director Rituparno Ghosh (who happens to be an alumnus of Jadavpur University, located in neighbouring Jadavpur). There is also the old NH1 studio and now several other new ones have cropped up.

With the construction in old Calcutta with various imported styles, the local temple architecture also reacted. Amongst the temples are the atchala temples of the Ghosh family built between 1788 and 1807. Prince Ghulam Mohammad built the mosque in Tollygunge in 1830.

Healthcare
One of the major government super speciality hospitals, M R Bangur, is situated in Tollygunge. An ISO certified hospital it serves as the district hospital for the district of South 24 Parganas. M R Bangur caters to the massive population of the district as well as adjoining metropolitan areas. Other important hospitals and nursing homes include - RSV, Bijoygar Government Hospital, Moore Avenue Polly Clinic, Tapan Sinha Memorial Hospital, Swiss Park Nursing Home Private Limited, Tollygunge Medical Hall, Arogya Maternity and Nursing Home, Medline Nursing Home, Apollo Clinic Bansdroni, Silver Line Eye Hospital, Calcutta Lions Netra Niketan, New Bangur Hospital and Cancer Research, Jissan International, Metro Railway Hospital, Tiss Path Lab, among others.

Electorate
Tollygunge happens to be a Vidhan Sabha constituency in the West Bengal Legislative Assembly and several neighbourhoods in this area like Golf Green, Bijoygarh, Bikramgarh, Azadgarh etc. served as refugee colonies post the 1971 Bangladesh Liberation War. It is currently represented by Aroop Biswas of the All India Trinamool Congress in the Legislative Assembly, who also serves as Minister for North Bengal Development in the Government of West Bengal. Erstwhile Leader of the Opposition in the Assembly, Pankaj Banerjee preceded Biswas. The first Left Front Mayor of Kolkata, Prasanta Sur, represented Tollygunge in several successive elections. Hence, Tollygunge has a very vast and versatile political and socio-economic history. Ambika Chakrabarty and Niranjan Sengupta, had earlier been elected from Tollygunge several number of times within the 1950-70s. Both were veteran fighters of the Bengal Independence movement, having been members of the Chittagong Jugantar Party and the Dhaka Anushilan Samity, respectively. Tollygunge is currently part of the Jadavpur Lok Sabha Constituency, which famous singer Kabir Suman represented from 2009 to 2014. Earlier, it fell within the South Kolkata constituency. As per the orders of the Delimitation Commission, Tollygunge Vidhan Sabha now comprises the following wards: 94, 95, 97, 98, 100, 111, 112, 113 and 114 of the Kolkata Municipal Corporation.

References

External links

Neighbourhoods in Kolkata
Red-light districts in India